Mohiuddin Ahmed is a politician from Barisal District of Bangladesh. He was elected a member of parliament from Barisal-4 (Bakerganj-4) in 1991 Bangladeshi general election.

Career 
Mohiuddin Ahmed was elected a Member of Parliament from Barisal-4 (Bakerganj-4) constituency as an Bangladesh Awami League candidate in the Five Parliamentary Election on 27 February 1991.

References 

Living people
Year of birth missing (living people)
People from Barisal District
Awami League politicians
5th Jatiya Sangsad members